Leoncio Evita Enoy (Udubuandolo, August 8, 1929 – Bata, December 1996) was an intellectual, painter and writer from Equatorial Guinea.

Life
He attended several schools in San Carlos and learned drawing by correspondence. He worked as a teacher in Bata's Escuela de Artes y Oficios (School of Arts and Offices) and was a regular contributor to the Poto-Poto literary magazine. He lived in Cameroon from 1953 to 1960.

Works
Cuando los combes luchaban, 1953, considered the first novel from Equatorial Guinea.
Alonguegue (No me salvaré)
El guiso de Biyé.

Anthologies
Donato Ndongo-Bidyogo; Mbaré Ngom (eds.) Literatura de Guinea Ecuatorial : antología, Madrid, España : SIAL Ediciones,

References

External links
 Biography
 Cap. VII, "Cuando los combes luchaban"

1929 births
1996 deaths
Equatoguinean novelists
Equatoguinean male writers
Male novelists
20th-century novelists
Equatoguinean painters
20th-century painters
People from Bata, Equatorial Guinea
People from Litoral (Equatorial Guinea)
20th-century male writers